Lorenzo 'Laurie' Serafini (born 1 November 1958) is a former Australian rules footballer who played with Fitzroy in the VFL during the late 1970s and mid 1980s, having been recruited from Assumption College Kilmore and the PDJFA. He is the younger brother of Renato Serafini, who also played for Fitzroy in the 1970s. From an Italian background, his parents, Carlo and Adelina hailed from Marostica, in the Veneto region of Italy.

Serafini started as a full forward, kicking a goal with his first kick in League football, and a total of four on debut. However, in his second season was moved onto the wing, half back flank, and later cemented the fullback spot, when Harvey Merrigan retired. In 1983 he alternated between  half back flank and full back; and was Fitzroy's top vote getter in the 1983 Brownlow Medal count. He was club vice captain 1981–1982, and a three time Victorian representative. Serafini remained involved in football after injuries caused his premature retirement, writing part time for the newly launched Sunday Age and reporting on the famous 1989 Grand Final. In 1998 when his old club merged with the Bears he became a director at the Brisbane Lions. At the end of 1998, Serafini assisted Andrew Ireland ( CEO ) to interview Leigh Matthews as the club's next coach, leading to the 2001, 2002 and 2003 Brisbane Lions Premierships. He remained on the Board for 14 years.

References

Holmesby, Russell and Main, Jim (2007). The Encyclopedia of AFL Footballers. 7th ed. Melbourne: Bas Publishing.

1958 births
Living people
Fitzroy Football Club players
Australian rules footballers from Victoria (Australia)
Victorian State of Origin players
Sportspeople of Italian descent
People of Venetian descent
Australian people of Italian descent